Abobaker Mamoun Eisa (born 5 January 1996) is a Sudanese professional footballer who plays for the English club Bradford City as a winger.

Early life
Eisa was born in Khartoum, Sudan, in 1996. His family moved to London when he was seven years old.

Club career

Early career
Eisa played youth football with Pro Touch Soccer Academy and St Albans City, before beginning his senior career in non-league football with Uxbridge and Wealdstone. He turned professional on 31 January 2018 with Shrewsbury Town, scoring his first goal for the club in the English Football League on 21 April in a 1−1 draw against Bury.

On 8 April 2018, he appeared as an unused substitute in the 2018 EFL Trophy Final, and received a runner-up medal under the tournament's rules.

In January 2019, he moved on loan to Colchester United. He made a goalscoring debut for the club on 2 February, scoring five minutes after his introduction as a half-time substitute during Colchester's 4–0 win at Northampton Town. 

On 15 August 2019, Eisa signed for the League Two side Scunthorpe United on a two-year deal, reuniting with the former Shrewsbury manager Paul Hurst, making him the club's eighth summer signing.

He was one of 17 players released by Scunthorpe at the end of the 2020–21 season.

Bradford City
On 18 June 2021, it was announced that Eisa had signed a two-year deal with another League Two side, Bradford City, and would transfer after his contract expiry.

In July 2021, before the start of the 2021–22 season, Eisa spoke highly about the club's pre-season preparation. He suffered an injury early in the season, and, after returning to the first team, underwent hamstring surgery in December 2021, ruling him out for a further four months. By late April 2022, he had returned to training was in possible contention for first team action in the final games of the season. In June 2022, the Bradford City manager, Mark Hughes, said that Eisa could be considered a new signing after returning from injury, having only played in five matches in the previous season. In July 2022, Eisa said he was happy to have returned to fitness. He was injured again later that month, with what was described as a "significant" injury. He returned to full training in September 2022, and made his first appearance of the 2022–23 season as a late substitute in the EFL trophy on 19 October 2022. On 12 November 2022, he made his first start since 27 November 2021. He said he was looking forward to playing more frequently. He scored his first Bradford City goal on 1 January 2023, scoring the winner in a 3–2 home victory against Salford.

International career
In August 2021, he was called up by the Sudan national team, but could not play for them due to injury. In November 2021, he said he was keen to represent Sudan, but was putting his club first.

Personal life
He is the brother of Mohamed Eisa. He has said that Mohamed has been a role model to him. A younger brother Omar is also a footballer.

He combined his non-league career with studying for a degree in biomedical sciences at Brunel University.

Honours
Shrewsbury Town
EFL Trophy runner-up: 2017–18

References

1996 births
Living people
People from Khartoum
Sudanese footballers
St Albans City F.C. players
Uxbridge F.C. players
Wealdstone F.C. players
Shrewsbury Town F.C. players
Colchester United F.C. players
Scunthorpe United F.C. players
Bradford City A.F.C. players
National League (English football) players
English Football League players
Association football wingers
Sudanese expatriate footballers
Sudanese expatriate sportspeople in England
Expatriate footballers in England
Alumni of Brunel University London